The Wilderness Fund is a Bulgarian non-governmental organization for the conservation, research and restoration of the environment established on 30 October 1989.  Member of the International Union for Conservation of Nature (IUCN), awarded the Ford Foundation prize for natural heritage protection in 1997.

See also 

 IUCN
 Conservation movement
 Environmental movement
 Natural environment
 Sustainability

References

Organizations established in 1989
Nature conservation organisations based in Europe
Environmental organizations based in Bulgaria